The Municipality of Tepic is one of the 20 municipalities dividing the Mexican state of Nayarit; its head city (the seat of the municipal government), the city of Tepic, is also the capital of the state.

Geography 
The municipality of Tepic is located in the center-south zone of the state of Nayarit, just at the foot of the Sierra Madre Oriental mountain range and in its transition towards the Pacific Coastal Plain. It has a territorial extension of 766 sq mi  (1983.3 km2) that represent 7.25% of the total extension of Nayarit, ranking it as the sixth most extensive municipality in the state. Its geographic coordinates are 21° 23'N - 21° 52'N and 104° 35'W - 105° 09'W and its altitude ranges from a maximum of 7,546 feet (2,300 m) to a minimum of 328 feet (100 m) above sea level.

Demography 
According to the results of the 2020 General Census of Population and Housing conducted by the National Institute of Statistics and Geography (INEGI), the municipality of Tepic has a total population of 425,924 people, of which 49.6% (211,258) are men and 50.4% (214,666) are women.

Localities 
In the municipality of Tepic there are 138 localities. List of localities with population above 1,000 include:

Politics 

The government of the municipality corresponds to the City Council which is made up of the Municipal President, a Syndic and 16 Councillors; all are elected by free, direct and secret popular vote for a period of three years, not re-eligible for the immediate period but discontinuously, and they enter to exercise their positions on September 17 of the year of their election.

Legislative representation 
For the election of local deputies to the Congress of Nayarit and of federal deputies to the House of federal Deputies, the municipality of Tepic is included in the following electoral districts:
 I Electoral District Venue of Nayarit with cabecera in Tepic.
 II Electoral District Venue of Nayarit with cabecera in Tepic.
 III Electoral District Venue of Nayarit with cabecera in Tepic.
 II Electoral District Federal of Nayarit with cabecera in the city of Tepic.

Municipal presidents

References 

Municipalities of Nayarit